CAU Rugby Valencia is a rugby union club based in Valencia, Spain. The club currently competes in the second-tier División de Honor B.

History
CAU Rugby Valencia was founded in 1973 by members of the University of Valencia, led by Luis Sebastián Caballero. After many years of playing at regional, provincial and national levels, the club was promoted to the Primera Nacional division in 1996. Two seasons later it moved up to the second-tier División de Honor B, and finally to the División de Honor in 2001. They were relegated in 2011.

Season by season

3 seasons in División de Honor
13 seasons in División de Honor B

References

External links
 Official site

Spanish rugby union teams
Sports teams in the Valencian Community
Rugby clubs established in 1973
Sport in Valencia